is a prefecture of Japan located on the island of Shikoku. Tokushima Prefecture has a population of 728,633 (1 October 2019) and has a geographic area of 4,146 km2 (1,601 sq mi). Tokushima Prefecture borders Kagawa Prefecture to the north, Ehime Prefecture to the west, and Kōchi Prefecture to the southwest.

Tokushima is the capital and largest city of Tokushima Prefecture, with other major cities including Anan, Naruto, and Yoshinogawa. Tokushima Prefecture is located on the Kii Channel, connecting the Pacific Ocean and Seto Inland Sea, across from Wakayama Prefecture on the Kii Peninsula of the island of Honshu. Tokushima Prefecture is connected to Awaji Island across the Naruto Strait by the Ōnaruto Bridge as part of the Kobe-Awaji-Naruto Expressway, connecting the prefecture to the city of Kobe and the San'yō Expressway on Honshu.

History 

Until the Meiji Restoration, Tokushima Prefecture was known as Awa Province.

Tokushima Prefecture and Myodo Prefecture 
In ancient times, Tokushima City belonged to a region known as Myōdō-gun. In the first wave of government consolidation following the abolishment of the fiefdom system and construction of prefectures in 1871, it became known as Myodo Prefecture. At the time, it included the Awa region to the south and the Awaji Island regions as well. In 1873 it further incorporated the region currently occupied by Kagawa Prefecture in its borders.

In the second wave of government consolidation, on September 5, 1875, the Sanuki Region separated to form the modern day Kagawa Prefecture. On August 21, 1876, Awaji Island separated to join Hyogo Prefecture and the Awa region separated to form Kochi Prefecture.

On March 2, 1880, Myodo Prefecture fully separated from Kochi Prefecture to be inaugurated as Tokushima Prefecture.

Post-war 
 1945 August    – End of World War II. The Washi no Mon gate to Tokushima Castle is destroyed by fire.
 1946 December  – The Nankai earthquake occurs, causing vast damage throughout the prefecture.
 1947 May       – Naruto City is inaugurated.
 1949 May       – Tokushima University is created.
 1951 June      – Komatsushima City is inaugurated.
 1953 November  – The Prefectural Library is completed in Tokushima Park
 1957 November  – The Nagayasuguchi Dam is completed along the Naka River
 1958 January   – A ferry from Komatsushima to Wakayama sinks. All passengers are lost.
 1958 May       – Anan City is inaugurated.
 1959 April     – Shikoku Hoso begins TV broadcasts.
 1960 May       – A tsunami caused by a quake in Chile causes damage in the prefecture's south.
 1961 April     – The Short Term Women's College in Tokushima is opened, later reformed into Shikoku University.
 1961 July      – The Lesser Naruto Bridge is opened in the Lesser Naruto Straits.
 1963 April     – The Tokushima Municipal Culture Center is completed.
 1963 July      – A new thermal electric power plant is created in Anan.
 1967 January   – Construction of the Tokushima Airport terminal is completed.
 1970 August    – Construction of the Koboke Dam on the Yoshino River is terminated.
 1972 January   – Use of a railway connecting the towns of Itano and Kamiita is terminated.
 1972 July      – Construction of Route 11 over the Yoshino River Ohashi is completed.
 1973 April     – A railway is opened connecting the Mugi and Kaifu regions.
 1974 October   – Tokushima-born Takeo Miki is elected as Prime Minister of Japan.
 1975 March     – Construction of the Ikeda Dam over the Yoshino River is completed.
 1976 July      – A ceremony is held to celebrate the beginning of construction for the Onaruto Bridge.
 1981 October   – The National University Naruto Kyoiku Daigaku is opened.
 1982 August    – Ikeda Highschool takes first place in the 64th National Baseball Championships.
 1985 March     – Use of the Komatsushima trainline is stopped.
 1985           – The Onaruto Bridge, connecting Tokushima and Hyogo Prefectures, is completed.
 1989 May       – The 40th National Planting Festival is held in the Kamiyama Shirin Park.
 1990 January   – Plans for a seaside park in Tokushima City are called off.
 1990 November  – Construction of the Bunka no Mori park area is completed, and the Tokushima Prefectural Library shifts grounds to here.
 1991 June      – Plans for a resort in the Kurozo Marsh in Ikeda-cho are called off.
 1992 March     – A railway is opened connecting the Kaifu and Kamoura regions.
 1993 August    – Route 55 is extended from Komatsushima City down to Anan City.
 1993 September – The 48th National Citizen's Athletics Festival, Shikoku East Summer Festival is held conjunctively with Kagawa Prefecture.
 1993 October   – The East Shikoku Autumna Athletics Festival is held.
 1993 October   – Construction of Asty Tokushima is completed.
 1994 March     – The first highway in the prefecture is completed, running from Aizumi to Wakimachi.
 1995 January   – The Kobe earthquake occurs
 1998 March     – The Otsuka Museum of Fine Arts is opened.
 1998 April     – Tokushima and mainland Japan are connected with the completion of the Akashi Kaikyo Bridge
 1999 July      – Construction of the Awa Odori Dance Hall is completed.
 2000 January   – A referendum for building a sluice-gate dam over the Yoshino River is rejected by the citizens.
 2000 July      – Construction of a second thermal electric power generator is completed within the prefecture.
 2000 October   – Construction of the Hosokawauchi Dam over the Naka River is terminated.
 2001 August    – The 13th National Agricultural Youth Exchange takes place.
 2002 March     – Governor Toshi Endo is arrested under charges of bribery.
 2002 October   – The Prefectural Calligraphy Hall is opened.
 2003 June      – The Komatsushima factory for Toyobo is shut down.
 2004 October   – Yoshinogawa City is inaugurated.
 2004 October   – The 28th National Planting Festival is held in Kamiyama's Shirin Park.
 2004 December  – The soccer team Tokushima Vortis enters J2, making the first ever Shikoku J-league team.
 2005 March     – Mima City and the towns of Tsurugi and Naka are inaugurated.
 2005 April     – Anan City is inaugurated, and the South District Administration Bureau is created.
 2005 April     – The Shikoku Island League is created, and baseball team The Indigo Socks represents Tokushima.
 2006 March     – Miyoshi City and Higashi Miyoshi Town are inaugurated.
 2006 March     – The towns of Minami and Kaiyo are inaugurated.
 2006 April     – The West District Administration Bureau is created.
 2006 May       – The Tokushima Red Cross Hospital shifts location.
 2007 May       – The sports stadium Aguri Anan Stadium is opened.
 2007 October   – Tokushima becomes home for the 22nd National Culture Festival.

Geography 

The Sanuki Mountains run along the northern border of the prefecture.

As of April 1, 2012, 9% of the total land area of the prefecture was designated as Natural Parks, namely the Setonaikai National Park; Muroto-Anan Kaigan and Tsurugisan Quasi-National Parks; and Chūbu Sankei, Dochū-Kōtsu, Hashikura, Higashi Sankei, Okumiyagawa-Uchidani, and Ōasayama Prefectural Natural Parks.

Cities

Eight cities are located in Tokushima Prefecture:

Towns and villages
These are the towns and villages in each district:

Mergers

Economy and Industry 
Tokushima depends on agriculture, forestry and fisheries. The percentage of agricultural workers and productivity is the second largest in Shikoku next to Kochi. Rice fields occupy the lower region of the Yoshino River and the small, narrow plains along the shore. Much of the remaining land is used for vegetables and flowers. The prefecture is the nation's largest supplier of cauliflower and lotus roots, and the fourth largest producer of carrots. Japanese indigo is only produced here.

Northern Tokushima's growth was accelerated by the completion of the Akashi Channel Bridge, which completes the road connection from Tokushima to Kobe. Industrial development continues around the Tokushima and Naruto districts. In particular, Itano District's Aizumi Town and Kitajima Town have experienced rapid growth, which has led to a proposed merger of the towns of Itano District into Itano City in the future.

 In April next year a school of tech entrepreneurship - the first of its kind in Japan - will open in the Tokushima town of Kamiyama. The students, aged from 15 to 20, will be taught engineering, programming and designing, as well as business skills such as marketing. They will also learn how to pitch their business plans to investors in order to raise money.

The man behind it is Chikahiro Terada, the boss of Tokyo-based start-up Sansan, which specialises in the digitalisation of business cards. These still play a huge role in Japan's corporate world.

Agriculture 
Tokushima abounds in agricultural resources and is the site of large-scale production of many different types of vegetables. The plains north of the Yoshino River are particularly fertile and the produce here is often shipped to mainland Japan in the areas around Kobe, Osaka and Kyoto. Produce from Tokushima always claims top shares in markets in the Kansai region and particularly prominent are Naruto sweet potatoes, the citrus fruit "sudachi", lotus roots and strawberries.

The lack of goods heading to Tokyo has led to a relatively low national profile for local Tokushima brands. To combat this, the local Tokushima government now sends the "Fresh! Tokushima" moving display about the country with its mobile kitchen set to increase general awareness of the local food available in Tokushima Prefecture.

 Rice – Anan City
 Naruto Sweet Potatoes – Naruto City
 Corn – Ishii-cho, Yoshinogawa City East
 Sudachi – All across the prefecture, but mainly in Kamiyama-cho
 Bamboo Shoots – Anan City
 Spring Onions – Tokushima City
 Lettuce – Awa City and the north shore of the Yoshino River
 Lotus roots – Naruto City
 Carrots – All across the prefecture, but mainly in Aizumi-cho
 Cranshaw – All across the north shore of the Yoshino River, but mainly in Itano-cho
 Rakkyo – Naruto City
 Taranome – All across the West of the prefecture, but mainly in Yamashiro-cho, Miyoshi City
 Sencha – Yamashiro-cho, Naka-cho, and the former Aioi-cho
 Strawberries – All through the mountainous regions, but mainly in Sanagouchi-son
 Grapes – Awa City
 Egg plant – Naruto City
 Satsuma mandarins – All across the prefecture, but mainly in Katsuura-cho
 Yuzu – Naka-cho
 Yamamomo – Komatushima City
 Tsumamono – Kamikatsu-cho, Yamashiro-cho, Kamiyama-cho
 Daikon radish – Naruto City
 Japanese apricot – Awa-shi, but mainly in Misato-son

Demographics

Culture 
 Naruto whirlpools
 Awa Odori Kaikan Hall
 Awa Marionette Jōruri
 Mt. Bizan
 Tokushima Prefectural Awa Jurobei Yashiki Puppet Theater and Museum
 Tokushima Handicraft Village
 Iya Valley
 Oboke Koboke Gorge
 Tokushima Castle
 Ichinomiya Castle

Sports 

Tokushima hosted the official 2007 Asian Basketball Championship.

Further, the sports teams listed below are based in Tokushima.

Football (soccer)
Tokushima Vortis

Baseball
Tokushima Indigo Socks

Transportation

Railway 
 JR Shikoku
 Kotoku Line
 Dosan Line
 Tokushima Line
 Mugi Line
 Naruto Line
 Asa Seaside Railway

Road 
 Route 11
 Route 28
 Route 32 (Miyoshi)
 Route 55
 Route 192
 Route 193
 Route 195
 Route 318
 Route 319
 Route 377
 Route 438
 Route 439
 Route 492

Expressway 
 Kobe-Awaji-Naruto Expressway
 Takamatsu Expressway
 Tokushima Expressway

Long Distance Bus (from Tokushima) 
 Tokyo (Tokyo Station, Shinagawa, Shinjuku)
 Tokyo Disneyland
 Yokohama
 Nagoya
 Yokkaichi
 Toyama
 Kanazawa
 Fukui
 Kyoto
 Kansai International Airport
 Osaka (Umeda, Namba, Universal Studio Japan)
 Kobe (Sannomiya, Maiko)
 Sumoto
 Takamatsu
 Matsuyama
 Kochi
 Okayama
 Hiroshima

Airport 
Tokushima Awa-Dancing Airport

Ferry from Tokushima Port 
 Wakayama
 Tokyo
 Kitakyushu

Prefectural symbols 
Tokushima's prefectural symbol is a stylized combination of the hiragana for to and ku, the first two characters in the hiragana spelling of the prefecture's name.

Politics

Prefectural Governor (as elected by public vote) 
 1st – Goro Abe (阿部五郎 – April 16, 1947 – April 1, 1951
 2nd – Kuniichi Abe (阿部邦一) – May 21, 1951 – March 30, 1955
 3rd – Kikutaro Hara (原菊太郎) – April 25, 1955 – September 15, 1965
 4th – Yasunobu Takeichi (武市恭信) – October 9, 1965 – October 4, 1981
 5th – Shinzo Miki (三木申三) – October 5, 1981 – October 4, 1993
 6th – Toshio Endo (圓藤寿穂) – October 5, 1993 – March 15, 2002
 7th – Tadashi Oota (大田正) – April 30, 2002 – March 30, 2003
 8th – Kamon Iizumi (飯泉嘉門) – May 19, 2003 – present

Prefectural Assembly 
 All data is current to May 1, 2007.

See also 
Awa Dance Festival
Thirteen Buddhas of Anan

Notes

References
 Nussbaum, Louis-Frédéric and Käthe Roth. (2005).  Japan encyclopedia. Cambridge: Harvard University Press. ; OCLC 58053128

External links 

 English language pages of the official Tokushima Prefecture website
 English Living Guide to Tokushima 
 English Guide AWANAVI

 
Shikoku region
Prefectures of Japan